Nawabganj Sugar Factory Railway was built in 1932-33 to serve the sugar factory at Nawabganj, Barabanki, Uttar Pradesh. It was connected to the Bengal and North Western Railway (B&NWR) at Barabanki Junction. The B&NWR line and the sugar factory branch were both metre gauge. The line was later dismantled.

References 

Sugar mill railways
Metre gauge railways in India
1832 establishments in British India
History of rail transport in Uttar Pradesh
Transport in Barabanki, Uttar Pradesh
Indian companies established in 1832
Railway companies established in 1832